Yah may refer to:
 Jah, shortened form of Yahweh, the Hebrew name for God
 YAH, The IATA code for La Grande-4 Airport in northern Quebec, Canada
 Yazgulyam language, by ISO 639 code
 "Yah" (song), by Kendrick Lamar from his album Damn
 a young person from a particular class or subcultural group in the UK, also known as a 'rah'

See also
 IAH (disambiguation)
 YA (disambiguation)